Jenilee A. Harrison (born June 12, 1958) is an American actress who appeared as Cindy Snow, a cousin of and replacement for blonde roommate Chrissy Snow on the hit sitcom Three's Company, between 1980 and 1982. She went on to play Jamie Ewing Barnes in Dallas from 1984 to 1986.

Career 
Before breaking into show business, Harrison was a cheerleader from 1978–1980 for the Los Angeles Rams.

Personal life
In the early 1980s, Harrison dated L.A. Rams guard Dennis Harrah and Major League Baseball player Reggie Jackson.

Harrison married Dr. Bruce Oppenheim, a prominent Los Angeles-area chiropractor, who is the ex-husband of actress Cybill Shepherd. Oppenheim filed divorce proceedings against Harrison on February 23, 2022. She filed an application to restore her former name on October 21 of the same year.

Filmography

References

External links
 
 
 

1958 births
Living people
Actresses from Los Angeles
American cheerleaders
American film actresses
American television actresses
20th-century American actresses
National Football League cheerleaders
21st-century American actresses
21st-century American women